Asterocampa leilia, the Empress Leilia, Leilia hackberry butterfly or desert hackberry, is a species of butterfly in the family Nymphalidae.

Description
Adults are brownish orange, with white and black spots on the bottom of the wings. The length of the wings is 1.5 to 2 inches (38 to 51 mm).

Distribution
The species can be found in the south-western United States, including Arizona and Texas, as well as Mexico.

Ecology and habitat
Adults feed on dung, sap and rotten fruit. In very rare cases the species will feed on nectar. They live in canyons, streamsides, thorn scrubs, and washes. Males of the species will wait near their food plants for females to appear. Larvae feed on hackberry.

References

Apaturinae
Butterflies described in 1874
Butterflies of North America
Taxa named by William Henry Edwards